The 2012 Eastern Kentucky Colonels football team represented Eastern Kentucky University during the 2012 NCAA Division I FCS football season. They were led by fifth-year head coach Dean Hood and played their home games at Roy Kidd Stadium. They were a member of the Ohio Valley Conference (OVC). Eastern Kentucky had an overall record of 8–3 with a 6–2 mark in OVC play to finish in a tie for second place.

Schedule

Source: Schedule

Ranking movements

References

Eastern Kentucky
Eastern Kentucky Colonels football seasons
Eastern Kentucky Colonels football